Mike Smith (born April 15, 1976) is a retired American professional basketball player.

A 6'8" forward, Smith attended the University of Louisiana at Monroe before being selected by the Washington Wizards in the second round of the 2000 NBA Draft. At that time, the Wizards also had an unrelated Michael Smith on the roster. Smith played 1 season in the NBA, playing 17 games for the Wizards during the 2000–01 NBA season and averaged 3.0 points per game. His final NBA game was played on April 18, 2001 in a 92 - 98 loss to the Toronto Raptors where he recorded 3 points, 1 assist and 1 rebound.

References

External links
Michael Smith. Latin Basket

1976 births
Living people
20th-century African-American sportspeople
21st-century African-American sportspeople
African-American basketball players
American expatriate basketball people in Argentina
American expatriate basketball people in Chile
American expatriate basketball people in Cyprus
American expatriate basketball people in Greece
American expatriate basketball people in France
American expatriate basketball people in Mexico
American expatriate basketball people in Serbia
American expatriate basketball people in Venezuela
American men's basketball players
Basketball players from Louisiana
Fayetteville Patriots players
Halcones de Xalapa players
Halcones UV Córdoba players
JA Vichy players
Junior college men's basketball players in the United States
Keravnos B.C. players
KK FMP (1991–2011) players
Lechugueros de León players
Louisiana–Monroe Warhawks men's basketball players
Near East B.C. players
People from West Monroe, Louisiana
Quilmes de Mar del Plata basketball players
Small forwards
SIG Basket players
Trotamundos B.B.C. players
Washington Wizards draft picks
Washington Wizards players